The North Carolina General Assembly of 2005–06 was the legislature that was elected on November 2, 2004 by voters in North Carolina.  Members of the House of Representatives and Senate met in Raleigh, North Carolina in 2005 and 2006.  These were the first elections for the state legislature under a new redistricting plan approved in 2003. This General Assembly will perhaps be best remembered as the assembly that approved North Carolina's first state lottery.  It also approved new ethics laws for government officials and increased the state's minimum wage.

House of Representatives
The North Carolina State House, during the 2005–2006 session, consisted of 63 Democrats and 57 Republicans.  Several Republicans, Richard T. Morgan most prominent among them, continued to support the Democratic majority on some issues, as they had in the previous legislature (when the house was evenly divided by party).

House leaders

House members
 District 1: William C. Owens, Jr. (Dem) – Camden, Currituck, Gates, Pasquotank
 District 2: William T. Culpepper, III (Dem); Resigned January 3, 2006; Replaced by Timothy L. Spear (Dem) – Chowan, Dare, Gates, Perquimans, Tyrrell
 District 3: Alice Graham Underhill (Dem) – Craven, Pamlico
 District 4: Russell E. Tucker (Dem) – Craven, Martin, Pitt
 District 5: Howard J. Hunter, Jr. (Dem) – Bertie, Hertford, Northampton
 District 6: Arthur J. Williams (Dem) – Beaufort, Hyde, Washington
 District 7: John D. Hall (Dem); Died March 17, 2005; Replaced by Edward Jones – Halifax, Nash
 District 8: Edith D. Warren (Dem) – Greene, Martin, Pitt
 District 9: Marian N. McLawhorn (Dem) – Pitt
 District 10: Stephen A. LaRoque (Rep) – Duplin, Lenoir
 District 11: Louis M. Pate, Jr. (Rep) – Wayne
 District 12: William L. Wainwright (Dem) – Craven, Jones, Lenoir
 District 13: Jean R. Preston (Rep) – Carteret, Onslow
 District 14: George G. Cleveland (Rep) – Onslow
 District 15: W. Robert Grady (Rep) – Onslow
 District 16: Carolyn H. Justice (Rep) – New Hanover, Pender
 District 17: Bonner L. Stiller (Rep) – Brunswick, New Hanover
 District 18: Thomas E. Wright (Dem) – Brunswick, Columbus, New Hanover
 District 19: Daniel F. McComas (Rep) – New Hanover
 District 20: Dewey L. Hill (Dem) – Brunswick, Columbus
 District 21: Larry M. Bell (Dem) – Duplin, Sampson, Wayne
 District 22: Edd Nye (Dem) – Bladen, Sampson
 District 23: Joe P. Tolson (Dem) – Edgecombe, Wilson
 District 24: Jean Farmer-Butterfield (Dem) – Edgecombe, Wilson
 District 25: William G. Daughtridge, Jr. (Rep) – Nash
 District 26: N. Leo Daughtry (Rep) – Johnston, Wayne
 District 27: Michael H. Wray (Dem) – Granville, Vance, Warren
 District 28: James H. Langdon, Jr. (Rep) – Johnston
 District 29: Paul Miller (Dem); Resigned 2006; Replaced by Larry D. Hall – Durham
 District 30: Paul Luebke (Dem) – Durham
 District 31: Henry M. Michaux, Jr. (Dem) – Durham
 District 32: James W. Crawford, Jr. (Dem) – Durham, Granville, Vance
 District 33: Bernard Allen (Dem); Died October 2006; Replaced by Dan Blue – Wake
 District 34: Grier Martin (Dem) – Wake
 District 35: Jennifer Weiss (Dem) – Wake
 District 36: Nelson Dollar (Rep) – Wake
 District 37: Paul Stam (Rep) – Wake
 District 38: Deborah K. Ross (Dem) – Wake
 District 39: Linda Coleman (Dem) – Wake
 District 40: Rick L. Eddins (Rep) – Wake
 District 41: J. Russell Capps (Rep) – Wake
 District 42: Marvin W. Lucas (Dem) – Cumberland,
 District 43: Mary E. McAllister (Dem) – Cumberland
 District 44: Margaret H. Dickson (Dem) – Cumberland
 District 45: Rick Glazier (Dem) – Cumberland
 District 46: Douglas Y. Yongue (Dem) – Hoke, Robeson, Scotland
 District 47: Ronnie N. Sutton (Dem) – Hoke, Robeson
 District 48: Garland E. Pierce (Dem) – Hoke, Robeson, Scotland
 District 49: Lucy T. Allen (Dem) – Franklin, Halifax, Nash
 District 50: Bill Faison (Dem) – Caswell, Orange
 District 51: John I. Sauls (Rep) – Harnett, Lee
 District 52: Richard T. Morgan (Rep) – Moore
 District 53: David R. Lewis (Rep) – Harnett
 District 54: Joe Hackney (Dem) – Chatham, Orange, Moore
 District 55: Winkie Wilkins (Dem) – Durham, Person
 District 56: Verla C. Insko (Dem) – Orange
 District 57: Pricey Harrison (Dem) – Guilford
 District 58: Alma S. Adams (Dem) – Guilford
 District 59: Maggie Jeffus (Dem) – Guilford
 District 60: Earl Jones (Dem) – Guilford
 District 61: Laura I. Wiley (Rep) – Guilford
 District 62: John M. Blust (Rep) – Guilford
 District 63: Alice L. Bordsen (Dem) – Alamance
 District 64: Cary D. Allred (Rep) – Alamance
 District 65: E. Nelson Cole (Dem) – Rockingham
 District 66: Melanie Wade Goodwin (Dem) – Montgomery, Richmond
 District 67: David Almond (Rep) – Montgomery, Stanly, Union
 District 68: J. Curtis Blackwood, Jr. (Rep) – Union
 District 69: Pryor A. Gibson, III (Dem) – Anson, Montgomery, Union
 District 70: Arlie F. Culp (Rep) – Randolph
 District 71: Larry W. Womble (Dem) – Forsyth
 District 72: Earline W. Parmon (Dem) – Forsyth
 District 73: Larry R. Brown (Rep) – Forsyth
 District 74: Dale R. Folwell (Rep) – Forsyth
 District 75: William C. McGee (Rep) – Forsyth
 District 76: Fred F. Steen, II (Rep) – Rowan
 District 77: Lorene T. Coates (Dem) – Rowan
 District 78: Harold J. Brubaker (Rep) – Randolph
 District 79: Julia C. Howard (Rep) – Davidson, Davie, Iredell
 District 80: Jerry C. Dockham (Rep) – Davidson
 District 81: L. Hugh Holliman (Dem) – Davidson
 District 82: Jeff Barnhart (Rep) – Cabarrus
 District 83: Linda P. Johnson (Rep) Cabarrus
 District 84: Phillip D. Frye (Rep) – Avery, Caldwell, Mitchell
 District 85: Mitch Gillespie (Rep) – Burke, Caldwell, McDowell
 District 86: Walter G. Church, Sr. (Dem) – Burke
 District 87: Edgar V. Starnes (Rep) – Alexander, Caldwell
 District 88: Mark W. Hollo (Rep) – Alexander, Catawba
 District 89: Mitchell S. Setzer (Rep) – Catawba
 District 90: James A. Harrell, III (Dem) – Alleghany, Surry
 District 91: Bryan R. Holloway (Rep) –  Stokes, Rockingham
 District 92: George M. Holmes (Rep) – Forsyth, Yadkin
 District 93: W. Eugene Wilson (Rep) – Ashe, Watauga
 District 94: R. Tracy Walker (Rep) – Wilkes
 District 95: Karen B. Ray (Rep) – Catawba, Iredell
 District 96:  Mark K. Hilton (Rep) – Catawba
 District 97: Joe L. Kiser (Rep) – Lincoln
 District 98: John W. Rhodes (Rep) – Mecklenburg
 District 99: Drew P. Saunders (Dem) – Mecklenburg
 District 100: James B. Black (Dem) – Mecklenburg
 District 101: Beverly M. Earle (Dem) – Mecklenburg
 District 102: Becky Carney (Dem) – Mecklenburg
 District 103: Jim Gulley (Rep) – Mecklenburg
 District 104: W. Edwin McMahan (Rep) – Mecklenburg
 District 105: Doug Vinson (Rep) – Mecklenburg
 District 106: Martha B. Alexander (Dem) – Mecklenburg
 District 107: W. Pete Cunningham (Dem) – Mecklenburg
 District 108: John M. Rayfield (Rep) – Gaston
 District 109: William A. Current (Rep) – Gaston
 District 110: Debbie A. Clary (Rep) – Cleveland, Gaston
 District 111: Tim Moore (Rep) – Cleveland
 District 112: Bobby F. England (Dem) – Cleveland, Rutherford
 District 113: Trudi Walend (Rep) – Henderson, Polk, Transylvania
 District 114: Susan C. Fisher (Dem) – Buncombe
 District 115: D. Bruce Goforth (Dem) – Buncombe
 District 116: Wilma M. Sherrill (Rep) – Buncombe
 District 117: Carolyn K. Justus (Rep) – Henderson, Transylvania
 District 118: Ray Rapp (Dem) – Haywood, Madison, Yancey
 District 119: R. Phillip Haire (Dem) – Haywood, Jackson, Macon, Swain
 District 120: Roger West (Rep) – Cherokee, Clay, Graham, Macon

Senate

The North Carolina State Senate, during the 2005–2006 session, consisted of 29 Democrats and 21 Republicans.

Senate Leaders

 Permanent Democratic Caucus Chair: R. C. Soles, Jr. (8th district)
 Democratic Caucus Secretary: Charles W. Albertson (10th district)

Senate members
 District 1: Marc Basnight (Dem) – Beaufort, Camden, Chowan, Currituck, Dare, Hyde, Pasquotank, Perquimans
 District 2: Scott Thomas (Dem); Resigned; Replaced by C.W. Bland – Carteret, Craven, Pamlico
 District 3: Clark Jenkins (Dem) – Bertie, Edgecombe, Martin, Pitt, Tyrrell, Washington
 District 4: Robert Lee Holloman (Dem) – Gates, Halifax, Hertford, Northampton
 District 5: John H. Kerr III (Dem) – Pitt, Wilson, Wayne
 District 6: Harry Brown (Rep) – Jones, Onslow
 District 7: Doug Berger (Dem) – Granville, Vance, Warren, Franklin
 District 8: R. C. Soles, Jr. (Dem) – Brunswick, Columbus, Pender
 District 9: Julia Boseman (Dem) – New Hanover
 District 10: Charles W. Albertson (Dem) – Duplin, Harnett, Sampson
 District 11: A. B. Swindell (Dem) – Franklin, Nash, Vance
 District 12: Fred Smith (Rep) – Johnston, Wayne
 District 13: David F. Weinstein (Dem) – Hoke, Robeson
 District 14: Vernon Malone (Dem) – Wake
 District 15: Neal Hunt (Rep) – Wake
 District 16: Janet Cowell (Dem) – Wake
 District 17: Richard Stevens (Rep) – Wake
 District 18: Bob Atwater (Dem) – Durham, Granville, Person
 District 19: Tony Rand (Dem) – Bladen, Cumberland
 District 20: Jeanne Hopkins Lucas (Dem) – Durham
 District 21: Larry Shaw (Dem) – Cumberland
 District 22: Harris Blake (Rep) – Harnett, Lee, Moore
 District 23: Eleanor Kinnaird (Dem) – Chatham, Orange
 District 24: Hugh Webster (Rep) – Alamance, Caswell
 District 25: William R. Purcell (Dem) – Anson, Richmond, Scotland, Stanly
 District 26: Phil Berger (Rep) – Guilford, Rockingham
 District 27: Kay Hagan (Dem) – Guilford
 District 28: Katie G. Dorsett (Dem) – Guilford
 District 29: Jerry W. Tillman (Rep) – Montgomery, Randolph
 District 30: Don W. East (Rep) – Stokes, Surry, Yadkin
 District 31: Hamilton C. Horton, Jr. (Rep); Died; Replaced by Peter S. Brunstetter  – Forsyth
 District 32: Linda Garrou (Dem) – Forsyth
 District 33: Stan Bingham (Rep) – Davidson, Guilford
 District 34: Andrew C. Brock (Rep) – Davie, Rowan, Yadkin
 District 35: W. Edward Goodall (Rep) – Mecklenburg, Union
 District 36: Fletcher L. Hartsell, Jr. (Rep) – Cabarrus, Rowan
 District 37: Daniel G. Clodfelter (Dem) – Mecklenburg
 District 38: Charlie Smith Dannelly (Dem) – Mecklenburg
 District 39: Robert Pittenger (Rep) – Mecklenburg
 District 40: Malcolm Graham (Dem) – Mecklenburg
 District 41: James Forrester (Rep) – Alexander, Iredell
 District 42: Austin M. Allran (Rep) – Catawba, Gaston, Lincoln
 District 43: David W. Hoyle (Dem) – Gaston
 District 44: Jim Jacumin (Rep) – Burke, Caldwell
 District 45: John Garwood (Rep) – Alleghany, Ashe, Caldwell, Watauga, Wilkes
 District 46: Walter H. Dalton (Dem) – Cleveland, Rutherford
 District 47: Keith Presnell (Rep) – Avery, Haywood, Madison, McDowell, Mitchell, Yancey
 District 48: Tom Apodaca (Rep) – Buncombe, Henderson, Polk
 District 49:  Martin L. Nesbitt, Jr. (Dem) – Buncombe
 District 50: John J. Snow, Jr. (Dem) – Cherokee, Clay, Graham, Haywood, Jackson, Macon, Swain, Transylvania

References

2005
General Assembly
General Assembly
 2005
 2005
2005 U.S. legislative sessions
2006 U.S. legislative sessions